Linnei is a railway station on the Taiwan Railways Administration West Coast line located in Linnei Township, Yunlin County, Taiwan.

History
The station was opened in 1907.

Around the station
 Farming and Irrigation Artifacts Museum

See also
 List of railway stations in Taiwan

References 

1907 establishments in Taiwan
Railway stations in Yunlin County
Railway stations opened in 1907
Railway stations served by Taiwan Railways Administration